Radim Nepožitek (born 26 June 1988) is a professional Czech football player, who currently plays for SK Eggenburg.

Honours 
SK Sigma Olomouc
 Czech Cup: 2011–12

References

External links
 
 

1988 births
Living people
Czech footballers
Czech First League players
SK Sigma Olomouc players
SFC Opava players
1. SC Znojmo players

Association football midfielders